Shanuka Silva (born 27 March 1997) is a Sri Lankan cricketer. He made his first-class debut for Sri Lanka Air Force Sports Club in Tier B of the 2016–17 Premier League Tournament on 28 December 2016.

References

External links
 

1997 births
Living people
Sri Lankan cricketers
Sri Lanka Air Force Sports Club cricketers
People from Sri Jayawardenepura Kotte